Susana is a feminine given name. Like its variants, which include the names Susanna and Susan, it is derived from Σουσάννα, Sousanna, the Greek form of the Hebrew שושנה, Shoshannah, which could have been derived from the Aramaic language. ܫܘܫܢ, Shoshan means lily in Syriac. سوسن, Susan, is the Persian spelling of this name. The spelling Susanna is used in Sweden, Italy, the Netherlands and Finland, as well as much of the English-speaking world. Zuzana is used in Czech Republic and Slovakia, and the spelling is Zsuzsanna in Hungary. In Polish it is Zuzanna. In addition to its use in English, the spelling Susana is also common in countries such as Spain and Portugal.

People with the given name

Authors, poets and writers 
Susana Calandrelli (1901-1978), Argentine writer and teacher
Susana Chavez-Silverman, American writer and professor
Susana Chávez (1974–2011), Mexican poet and activist
Susana Medina (born 1966), English-Spanish writer
Susana Molinari Leguizamón, Argentine writer
Susana Pagano (born 1968), Mexican author

Entertainment
Susana Duijm (born 1936), Venezuelan entertainer
Susana Félix (born 1975), Portuguese entertainer
Susana Miller, Argentinian tango dancer

Film and Television
Susana Blaustein Muñoz, Argentine film director
Susana Campos (1934-2004), Argentine actress
Susana Dosamantes (1948-2022), Mexican actress
Susana Freyre, Argentine actress
Susana Giménez (born 1944), Argentine actress and host
Susana González (born 1973), Mexican actress
Susana Werner (born 1977), Brazilian model and actress

Music
Susana Jamaladinova (born 1983), better known by her stage name Jamala, Ukrainian singer, actress and songwriter. Winner of Eurovision Song Contest 2016 
Susana, Lady Walton (1926–2010), wife of composer Sir William Walton
Susana Baca (born 1944), Peruvian singer
Susana - Sanne Boomhouwer (born 1984), Dutch trance music singer who performs under the mononym "Susana"
Susana Harp (born 1968), Mexican singer
Susana Rinaldi (born 1935), Argentine tango singer
Susana Seivane (born 1976), Galician gaita player
Susana Zabaleta (born 1964), Mexican singer and actress

Politics
Susana Camarero (born 1970), Spanish politician
Susana Chou (born 1941), Chinese politician
Susana Higuchi (born 1950), Peruvian politician and engineer
Susana Malcorra (born 1954), United Nations Under-Secretary-General for Field Support 
Susana Martinez (born 1959), Governor of New Mexico
Susana Mendoza (born 1972), City Clerk of Chicago
Susana Vilca, Peruvian congresswoman
Susana Villarán (born 1949), Peruvian politician

Sports
Susana Escobar (born 1987), Mexican swimmer and Olympian
Susana Feitor (born 1975), Portuguese racewalker
Susana Peper (born 1946), Argentine swimmer
Susana Somolinos (born 1977), Spanish judoka
Susana Torrejón (born 1960), Spanish Olympian sprint canoer

Others
Susana Barreiros (born 1981), Venezuelan judge
Susana Ferrari Billinghurst (1914–1999), Argentine aviator
Susana López Charretón (born 1957), Mexican virologist
Susana Beatriz Decibe, Argentine sociologist
Susana Urbina (born 1946), Peruvian-American psychologist

See also
Susanna (given name)
Susannah (given name)
Susan
Susie (disambiguation)
Suzanne (given name)
Susanne (given name)
Sue (name)

Given names derived from plants or flowers